Asyncritula is a genus of flies in the family Stratiomyidae.

Species
Asyncritula brevis James, 1978
Asyncritula limbipennis (Wulp, 1898)
Asyncritula pubescens James, 1978

References

Stratiomyidae
Brachycera genera
Taxa named by Embrik Strand
Diptera of Australasia